("Sweden's twelve [points]") was a one-off music competition in the Eurovision format, organised and broadcast by the Swedish broadcaster Sveriges Television (SVT). It served as an alternative for the Eurovision Song Contest 2020, which was planned to be held in Rotterdam, Netherlands, but was cancelled due to the COVID-19 pandemic.

The competition consisted of a pre-qualifying round on 9 May 2020, hosted by Christer Björkman and David Sundin, and a final on 14 May 2020, hosted by Christer Björkman and Sarah Dawn Finer. Both shows were broadcast live on SVT1, as well as on the streaming platform SVT Play.

Format 
During the pre-qualifying round on 9 May 2020, short clips of all forty-one entries that would have participated in the Eurovision Song Contest 2020 were shown, including the Swedish entry "Move" by the Mamas, despite not being a part of the programme's competitive element. From the remaining forty entries, televoting determined which twenty-five songs would be heard in full during the final on 14 May 2020. Only the Swedish public was able to vote and could do so via the Melodifestivalen app. In the final, which also featured a live performance of "Move" and a new song, "Let It Be", by the Mamas, it was determined which entry would have received Sweden's twelve points, had the Eurovision Song Contest not been cancelled.

Presenters 

The pre-qualifying round was hosted by two presenters: comedian David Sundin, who also co-hosted Melodifestivalen 2020, and singer and television producer Christer Björkman, who represented Sweden in the Eurovision Song Contest 1992. The final was hosted by Björkman and singer and television presenter Sarah Dawn Finer, who also co-hosted Melodifestivalen in 2012, 2016 and 2019.

Participants

Pre-qualifying round 
The pre-qualifying round  ("Ahead of the ESC") took place on 9 May 2020 at 21:00 CEST and featured short clips of the following competing entries:

Final 
The final took place on 14 May 2020 at 21:00 CEST and featured the twenty-five songs that qualified from the pre-qualifying round.

See also 
 Eurovision: Europe Shine a Light
 Der kleine Song Contest
 Die Grand Prix Hitliste
 Eurovision 2020 – das deutsche Finale
 Eurovision: Come Together
 Free European Song Contest

Notes

References

External links 
 Sveriges 12:a at SVT Play

2020 song contests
2020 in Swedish television
Television shows about the Eurovision Song Contest
Eurovision Song Contest 2020
2020 in Sweden
2020 in music
May 2020 events in Sweden
Events in Stockholm